Alicia Rodríguez may refer to:

 Alicia Rodríguez (FALN) (born 1953), Puerto Rican member of the FALN
 Alicia Rodríguez (Chilean actress) (born 1992)
 Alicia Rodríguez (Spanish actress) (born 1935)